Hellinsia cajanuma is a moth of the family Pterophoridae. It is found in Ecuador.

The wingspan is 26 mm. The forewings are straw-yellow and the marking are brown. The hindwings are pale grey. The fringes in the distal half are dark grey and proximal half pale ochreous. Adults are on wing in October, at an altitude of 2,850 meters.

Etymology
The species is named after the collecting site, the Cajanuma Ranger Station in Podocarpus National Park, near Loja in southern Ecuador.

References

Moths described in 2011
cajanuma
Moths of South America